"Better to Be Loved" is a single by Canadian singer-songwriter Francesco Yates. It was released in 2015 as a single from his EP Francesco Yates.

Charts

Weekly charts

Year-end charts

References

2015 singles
2015 songs
Songs written by Matt Morris (musician)
Songs written by Robin Hannibal